Rosetta Tofano (1902–1960) was an Italian costume designer and film star. She was a noted Costumier for the stage and films. In 1923 she met and married Sergio Tofano. She made her film debut in the lead role in the 1932 film Your Money or Your Life and made several further appearances over the next decade.

Selected filmography
 Your Money or Your Life (1932)
 Father For a Night (1939)
 Two on a Vacation (1940)

References

Bibliography 
 Goble, Alan. The Complete Index to Literary Sources in Film. Walter de Gruyter, 1999.

External links 
 

1902 births
1960 deaths
Italian film actresses
Actresses from Milan
20th-century Italian actresses
1960 suicides
Suicides in Italy